14. oktobar is a Serbian manufacturer of heavy machinery and equipment, headquartered in Kruševac, Serbia.

History
IMK 14. oktobar was established by Austrian and Hungarian investors in 1923 as Company specialized in wagons repair and manufacture. In the first years of the company, the primary activity is related to the overhaul and repair of vehicles and freight cars, at time is increased the use of quality in production technology by simultaneously extending the product range, which resulted in start of production of steel construction, metal consumer products, and products for use in the military industry.

After World War II, the company was nationalized and repaired from war damage. It was named in a memorial of the date when Kruševac was liberated form Nazi occupation in 1944. The company has oriented to production of construction, mining, agriculture and transportation, machinery and equipment for the purpose of manufacturing equipment and machine parts. It was one of the largest producers of heavy machinery in Yugoslavia. During its golden times, it employed around 8,000 people.

In 2015, after years of accumulated business losses, the company has suspended its production. From 2014 through 2015, nearly all of 1,500 employees left the company, using the social program. In 2016, the company has declared bankruptcy. In March 2016, a new company was register under name "14. oktobar". It took production facilities of the former company on lease.

In 2017, "SCMG 14. oktobar" from Belgrade on behalf of Czech company "Czechoslovak Group" bought the company. After the purchase, Prosecutor's Office of the Republic of Macedonia launched an investigation against former Macedonian head of the Administration for Security and Counterintelligence Sašo Mijalkov, on suspicion for money laundering and suspicious connections to the "Czechoslovak Group".

Products

Machines

Tracked tractor
 TG-120
 TG-160
 TG-220

Wheel loader
ULT-100
ULT-150
 ULT-160
 ULT-220
 K-220
Excavator
 BGH-250
Agriculture machinery
 UZT-24
 TG-50

Components
 Gearbox
 Tracked machines running gear
 Rigid driving axle
 Hydrodynamic couplings
 Axial bearings

Other products

 Hydraulic front tractor loader - TPU
 Hydraulic rear tractor backhoe loader - TZU
 Hydraulic truck crane KD-3S
 Extension trailer PP-075
 Hydraulic mower HIKOS 2000
 Hydraulic side mower CCB-50
 Hydraulic press HP-7/10
 Transport basket K-1
 Containershttp 
 Reservoirs and tanks

Military program

 LRSVM Morava
 M-94 Plamen-S
 M-96 Orkan II
 Tank power packs

References

External links
 

Companies based in Kruševac
Construction equipment manufacturers of Serbia
D.o.o. companies in Serbia
Manufacturing companies established in 2016
Serbian brands
Serbian companies established in 2016